Clark Spencer (born April 6, 1963) is an American film producer, businessman and studio executive best known for his work at Walt Disney Animation Studios, and for winning the Oscars for Best Animated Feature for his work on Zootopia and Encanto.

Biography 
Spencer was born in Seattle, Washington, and attended Woodrow Wilson High School in Tacoma, Washington from September 1976 to June 1981. Spencer graduated from Harvard University in 1985 with a degree in history.

He joined Walt Disney Feature Animation in 1993. He was director of planning but moved on to be senior vice president of finance and operations. He moved on to the Florida animation division of the company where he was the head of studio before becoming the producer of Lilo & Stitch (2002). Since then, Spencer has gone on to also produce the Disney animated film Bolt, as well as Winnie the Pooh, Wreck-It Ralph and Zootopia.

He was involved in the purchase of Miramax Films in the early 1990s.

In August 2019, Spencer was named president of Walt Disney Animation Studios after Andrew Millstein was moved over to co-president of Blue Sky Studios.

Filmography

Feature films

Short films

Awards
Producers Guild of America
 2008 – Nominated: Best Animated Motion Picture for Bolt
 2012 – Won: Best Animated Motion Picture for Wreck-It Ralph
 2016 – Won: Best Animated Motion Picture for Zootopia
 2018 – Nominated: Best Animated Motion Picture for Ralph Breaks the Internet
 2022 – Won: Best Animated Motion Picture for Encanto

Academy Award
 2016 – Won: Academy Award for Best Animated Feature for Zootopia
 2019 – Nominated: Academy Award for Best Animated Feature for Ralph Breaks the Internet
 2022 – Won: Academy Award for Best Animated Feature for Encanto

References

External links

1963 births
American animated film producers
American chief executives
American chief executives in the media industry
American film studio executives
Businesspeople from Seattle
Chairmen of The Walt Disney Company
Disney executives
Living people
Walt Disney Animation Studios people
American film producers
Harvard University alumni
Producers who won the Best Animated Feature Academy Award